Despite Gabon's small population (just over a million), this Central African country is home to many different Bantu tribes and a small pygmy population.

Here is a partial list of the ethnic groups in Gabon, by province.

Estuaire
Fang
Omiene Group
Benga
Akele
Simba
Beseki
Seke

Haut Ogooué
Téké
Mbahouin
Obamba
Bakaningui
Nzebi
Ndoumou
Ndassa 
Ndumu
Awandji 
Mbeté
Bakota

Moyen Ogooué
Apindji
Galoa
Fang
Akele
Vili
Enenga

Ngounié
Akélé
Banzebie
Mitsogho
Massango
Bavarama
Bapunu
Apindji
Bavungu
Guisir
Eviya

Mitsogho People
The Mitsoghos are the people of the Massifs de Chaillu mountains in the Ngounié province of Gabon. Tsogho is their language, hence the name Mi-Tsoghos (where the prefix "Mi" means plural). They are a relatively small ethnic group who are revered and feared for their abilities in conjuring spirits from the afterworld.

They may represent the first non-Baka Gabonese of the entire area. This knowledge can be extrapolated from the widespread usage of Mitsogho words and customs, especially pertaining to the animistic religious practices of all Gabonese ethnic groups. For example, Bwiti, the dominant religious doctrine of the country is a Mitshogo name and the Bwiti is based on the magic powers of "the sacred wood" or ibogha (small shrub - Tabernanthe iboga) which is also a Mitsogho word meaning healing-ibo and wood-gha.

Nearly all healing ceremonies in Gabonese traditional culture involve the singing of Mitsogho songs. In fact, Mitsogho words are so well known throughout the entire country that at one point the government was considering making Mitsogho the national ethnic language.

The majority of modern Mitsoghos live in Libreville and Mouila; however, their roots can be traced back north–south into the tropical mountain forests just west of where the Ngounié river meets the Ogoué river to where the Ogoulou river meets the Ngounié river. The most prominent old village sites were located near the 70 mile-long Ikobé valley.

This small but fierce group of people were the last ethnic group to be defeated by the French colonists (around 1940). In long-lived Mitsogho lore, a warrior by the name of Mbombet A Gnaghé hid out in the Ikobé valley to stage guerrilla attacks against the French military. Mbombet supposedly had magical powers, but was finally betrayed by a woman.

The modern day offspring who can be traced directly back to Mbombet still hold special positions within the traditional Mitsogho tribal authority. They are usually celebrated magicians and healers.

Nyanga
Bapunu
vili
lumbu

Ogooué-Ivindo
Fang
Bakota
Mahongue
Boungome
Kwele
Baschiwe
Basimba people
Akele

Ogooué-Lolo
Banzebi 
Puvi
Akele
Massango
Aduma

Ogooué-Maritime
Omiene group( Oroungu, Nkomi)
lumbu

Woleu Ntem
Fang
Haoussa
Baka